The proton pack is a fictional energy-based holding device, used for controlling and lassoing ghosts in the Ghostbusters universe. First depicted in the film Ghostbusters, it has a hand-held wand ("Neutrona Wand" or particle thrower) connected to a backpack-sized nuclear accelerator. It controls a stream of highly focused and radially polarized protons that electrostatically controls the negatively charged energy of a ghost, allowing it to be held in the stream.

In the Ghostbusters universe

The proton pack, designed and built by Dr. Egon Spengler, is a man-portable cyclotron system (and indeed Dr. Peter Venkman refers to the proton packs in one scene as "unlicensed nuclear accelerators"), that is used to create a charged particle beam—composed of protons—that is fired by the particle thrower (also referred to as the "neutrona wand"). Described in the first movie as a "positron collider", it functions by colliding high-energy positrons to generate its proton beam. The beam allows a Ghostbuster to contain and hold "negatively charged ectoplasmic entities". This containment ability allows the wielder to position a ghost above a trap for capture. The stream is also quite destructive to physical objects, and can cause extensive property damage.

The name proton pack is not used in the original movie at all, and is not used until the subway tunnel scene in Ghostbusters II, when Winston says that they should get their proton packs. The doorman to the Mayor's mansion also uses the term proton pack, asking the Ghostbusters if he can buy one from them for his little brother. Egon replies that "A proton pack is not a toy".

In the 1984 novelization of Ghostbusters the Proton Packs are mentioned, eg. “Stantz hauls out the formidable weaponry from the back of the Ectomobile and the four men kit themselves up, buckling on their proton packs…”

In the 2009 Ghostbusters game, Ray explains how the proton pack works early in the game; the energy emitted by the proton stream helps to dissipate psychokinetic (PK) energy which ghosts use to manifest themselves. Draining them of their PK energy weakens them, allowing them to be captured in their portable ghost traps.

According to a line spoken by Egon in Ghostbusters II, each pack's energy cell has a half-life of 5,000 years. Knobs on the main stock of the proton pack can perform various functions to customize the proton stream, including adjustments for stream intensity, length, and degrees of polarization. In the cartoon series The Real Ghostbusters, the maximum power setting for the proton packs is "500,000 MHz," which possibly refers to the rate of positron collisions occurring within the pack's accelerator system. In the cartoon the packs also have a self-destruct mechanism capable of affecting at least a half-mile radius. The Real Ghostbusters also made proton packs less efficient with power cells, allowing them to run out of energy when appropriate for dramatic tension.

For the 1997 animated spinoff Extreme Ghostbusters, the proton packs and ghost traps are redesigned to combat the threat of the malevolent Achira, an ancient disease-provoking entity accidentally released by workers constructing a new subway tunnel. Egon, with the help of Roland, Kylie and Eduardo, increased the proton packs' nuclear capability (to deal with Achira and other subsequent enemies, much stronger than what the original Ghostbusters had faced) and modified the power system; now, the packs required replaceable proton canisters to be loaded in for them to function. The trap was redesigned as well, into a gold-colored, round-shaped device with an opening hatch atop it. Kylie would typically carry it; due to this, she did not carry a normal proton pack, instead carrying a not-as-powerful proton pistol.

The IDW monthly Ghostbusters comic storyline has shown the movie pack, a boson dart capable pack and the Extreme Ghostbusters pack in use. The IDW comic also shows a proton pistol attachment to the movie pack being used by Winston while hunting down Slimer.

Crossing the streams

Crossing the streams was initially discouraged, as Egon believed that "total protonic reversal" would occur: this effect would have catastrophic results (see quote above) if they are crossed over three seconds. However, in a desperate effort to stop the powerful Gozer the Gozerian, Egon noted that the door to Gozer's temple "swings both ways" and that by crossing the streams, they may be able to create enough force to close the door on Gozer and its control. As the Ghostbusters cross the streams, the combination of that much energy closes the door to Gozer's dimension and severs its ties to our world. The resulting blast destroys a good portion of the roof and blows up the Stay Puft Marshmallow Man.

In Ghostbusters: The Video Game, the Ghostbusters mention that "crossing the streams" during the Gozer Incident (events of the first Ghostbusters film) only worked due to the presence of a cross-dimension portal (a tactic which is referred to as the "Gozer gambit" by Ray) and should only be used as a last resort. During the game's climax, the Ghostbusters are pulled into Ivo Shandor's ghostly realm and come face-to-face with Shandor's Destructor form, forcing them to resort to "crossing the streams" to defeat Shandor. The resulting blast not only destroys Shandor but also sends the team flying back to their dimension. During gameplay, it is possible for the player to cross the streams with another Ghostbuster, but this will only cause a burst of energy to travel down the stream and deal a massive amount of damage to the player, also knocking them off their feet for a short time, due to a new "safety" that was installed on the neutrona wand.

In the extended version of the reboot film Ghostbusters (2016), shows that its iteration of the Ghostbusters (Abby Yates, Erin Gilbert, Jillian Holtzman, and Patty Tolan) had initially tried to close Rowan North's portal with their crossed streams before resorting to use their Ecto-1's reactor to detonate an explosion that create the total protonic reversal powerful enough to seal it.

In Ghostbusters: Afterlife, Egon built proton cannons with the parts of the proton packs and a PKE meter in Summerville, Oklahoma, to keep Gozer's portal closed with safely fired crossed streams. Later, the Ghostbusters again crossing their proton streams against Gozer to counter its energy-based powers and to weaken its physical form, allowing them to capture the deity in their 198 ghost traps.

In Ghostbusters: The Video Game
The game features a modified version of the proton pack (an experimental prototype) which is given to the player (the Ghostbuster's new experimental equipment technician/guinea pig) for field testing. This new proton pack is equipped with other features (and upgrades) besides the standard proton stream.

As props in the real world
The props representing proton packs were originally thought to have been made by the prop department of Columbia Pictures. Recent information coming from the auction of a hero proton pack in July 2012 revealed that the hero proton packs could have been made by Boss Film Studios, a prop studio started by ILM veteran Richard Edlund. They are made of molded fiberglass shells on aluminium backplates (or "motherboards") bolted to military surplus A.L.I.C.E. frames. The basic shape was sculpted from foam; later, a rubber mold was made of it, from which fiberglass shells were pulled. The "wand" had an extending barrel mechanism and the electronics were quite advanced for the time. They were then finished with various surplus 1960s resistors, pneumatic fittings, hoses and ribbon cable, and surplus warning labels and custom-made metal fittings. These "hero" props were substituted in stunt scenes by flimsy foam rubber pulls from the same mould. The proton packs have a lightbar with 15 blue scrolling lights in a box on the left-hand side and 4 red lights in the circular "cyclotron" portion of the bottom of the prop that light up in rotation. The "wand" also featured numerous light features; the most elaborate versions had fluorescent bargraphs, incandescent bulbs, and strobing flashes in the tip for the visual effects crew to synchronize the 'streams' to.

The GB1 Hero proton packs were fiberglass shells mounted on aluminum motherboards with LC-1 ALICE Frames and straps. These packs had many aluminum parts on them, including: aluminum Ion Arm and cap, booster tube, injector tubes, HGA, vacuum line, PPD, Beamline and filler tube, as well as the N-Filter. The wands for these packs were also fully aluminum, minus the resin grips. All these external parts were pop riveted to the shell, which was then, in turn, mounted to the motherboard via L-Brackets and bolts at the four corners of the pack.

The GB1 stunt packs were packs that were cast in foam to be worn during physical stunts performed in the film. Many of the attached pieces of the hero packs are cast on to these packs in foam. These packs also featured static lights and were attached to plywood motherboards with different straps compared to the GB1 heroes. Other than the bumper, wand and hosing/ribbon cable, everything was cast into the foam shell of the pack.

Some packs from Ghostbusters were used in the follow-up Ghostbusters II; these packs were slightly redressed with a black crank knob and thinner ribbon cable. The angle of the gun, or "wand" mount was changed to pitch forward slightly, in order to make the prop easier for the actor to use. In addition to these redressed props, one of the originals was hastily cast as a buck to produce basic lightweight "midgrade" props (as a solution to complaints by the actors about the weight of the original prop). These midgrade pieces featured many details cast in as part of the mould, instead of separate fittings. The electronics and mechanisms were also cut down greatly, reducing the total weight. The original GB1 props would appear in close-ups, the midgrade in all other scenes, and new rubber "stunt" packs were made for whenever the actor needed to take a fall.

The proton pack props from the Ghostbusters movies are some of the most wanted and collectible props ever made. Several GB2 packs have surfaced for auction. In September 2004, one rubber stunt and one fiberglass midgrade prop were auctioned by Profiles in History. The midgrade prop fetched well over $13,000. The "semi-hero" pack, affectionately known as "Number Four", was bought from the auction winner by Ken Heugel for cash and a Sean Bishop replica pack.  The auction winner kept the Certificate of Authenticity. The "Number 4" pack was dissected and documented by Bishop and Heugel. The examination revealed much of the hurried and shoddy casting and assembly techniques used in its creation. The measurements of the proton pack taken during the examination are still used today by prop builders making their own proton packs. Unfortunately, "Number 4" was lost in 2005 during Heugel's move to Romania. The case that held the pack arrived in Romania empty. This theft was classified as "an airline baggage mishap". In July 2006, another Ghostbusters II mid-grade "semi-hero" pack with a Certificate of Authenticity was placed on auction by Profiles in History. This proton pack was later pulled when it was determined to be the Bishop replica pack matched with the real Certificate of Authenticity of the "Number 4".  This replica pack is distinct for its unusually rusty paint job.  In 2011 this pack was recovered when author Ernie Cline (Fanboys, Ready Player One) purchased it, returning it to Bishop's shop for a makeover prior to Cline's use of it on his 2011-2012 book signing tour.

All three variations of the GB2 pack have been displayed at various Planet Hollywood restaurants around the U.S. The Hero packs in GB2 were the same hero packs from GB1 but retrofitted so they had matching parts with the new packs they had to construct for filming. For all intents and purposes, these packs are built the same way, only with some cosmetic differences, such as different ribbon cables, different colored crank knob, the use of nycoil banjos on the wands, etc. Other than that, they are just beat up versions of their former selves from the first film.

Here are some obvious and subtle modifications done to the hero packs for GB2:
 The unique ribbon cable was replaced with regular Spectra Strip cable.
 The grey crank knobs were replaced with black ones (or simply painted).
 The V-hook on the gun mount was slightly angled forward on some packs (for ease of drawing).
 The LC-1 A.L.I.C.E. frames were replaced with LC-2 versions (painted black).
 Extra padding (commonly called "Super Straps") was added to the straps on some A.L.I.C.E. frames.
 The Legris banjos on the Neutrona Wand were replaced with Nycoil banjos.
 The packs were heavily weathered (not sure how intentional that was, though).
 The Ion Arm Cap was heavily weathered on most packs (this is useful in identifying different packs).
 The Ion Arm Rods were stripped of their black paint.
 The square Clippard elbow on the Ion Arm Cap was removed, and a hex elbow was installed on the Ion Arm itself.
 All the GB1 tubing was Clippard brand - GB2 used Nycoil and some Clippard.
 The socket head cap screws connecting the shell to the mother board were replaced with button head cap screws.
 The mesh inside of the N-filter was replaced with a white covering.

The Semi-Hero packs in GB2 were a new addition to the packs used in filming. These packs were stripped-down versions of the heroes, merging constructional concepts from both the heroes and the stunt packs into a mid grade pack for wide shots. These packs were also constructed lighter for the actors. many of the metal parts from the Hero packs were cast in resin and attached to the shell, such as the HGA, injector tubes, beamline and filler tube. Other metal parts, such as the Ion Arm, Booster Tube (and frame), PPD, and N-Filter, were actually cast into the shell, much like the foam stunt packs from the first film. These packs also had fiberglass cast wands, instead of the metal ones from the first film.

The GB2 foam stunt packs seem to have been built somewhat better than the GB1 foam stunt packs. The foam packs seem to be constructed the same way as the semi-heroes but instead of being cast as fiberglass, they were cast in foam instead. Once again, the Ion Arm, Booster Tube (and frame), PPD and N-Filter were cast onto the shell and part of the mold.

Besides the video game, there is one more instance of Columbia/Sony having packs produced for production. That would be the packs made for the Universal Studios Florida stage show. As to how much lineage these packs actually have is still up in the air. If the master for these mold was retooled from a production mold, it was heavily modified. There is much extra material added around the EDA, both where the beamline and filler tubes go, as well as between the injector tubes and the EDA. At least the bottom half of the Booster tube and frame are cast into the shell as well as the N-Filter. There also seems to be much warpage at this point. These packs were also mounted on what seems like MDF motherboards and LC-2 ALICE frames.

The proton pack worn by Bill Murray during his acceptance speech at the 2010 Scream Awards was a reproduction semi-hero pack made by Bishop.

In July 2012, Profiles in History auctioned a Ghostbusters hero pack.  This proton pack was reportedly worn by Harold Ramis.  The source of the pack is suspected to be Sony.  This "Harold Pack" shows some modifications made to the hero packs from Ghostbusters  to Ghostbusters II.  The Harold Pack also showed some damaged and missing parts, most notably a missing crank knob and a broken N-Filter.  There is also a clear tube from the Ghostbusters uniform shown with the Harold Pack.  It is unknown if the electronics inside the pack are in working order.  The "Harold Pack" sold for $130,000.  The same Profiles in History auction also features the Ghostbusters ghost trap and pedal used when Slimer is captured in the hotel ballroom.  This "Slimer Trap" is supposed to have a working pedal mechanism, but the operational status of that is also unknown.  The "Slimer Trap" sold for $60,000.

Many movie prop replica communities (prop forums) have sprung up regarding proton-pack research, and list various methods and plans for constructing a replica proton pack.  Plans, methods, parts and advice can be obtained from the members of these prop forums to help build a proton pack out of simple cardboard to create movie-accurate aluminum and fiberglass (shell) hero-pack replicas.  Some of the more complex proton pack replicas being built have lights and sound.  These prop forums also have information on other Ghostbusters props, ranging from the ghost trap, to the slime blower, to the Ectomobile.  Some of these prop forums also have members who sell replica shells, motherboards and other parts that would be necessary in order to build a replica proton pack.

Early script descriptions of the proton pack stated that each pack had two neutrino wands, strapped to the wrists, rather than one held in a fashion similar to an assault rifle. Toy proton packs were formerly made by Kenner and became available in toy shops. They consisted of a plastic hollow pack and gun, with a yellow foam cylinder attached to the front of the gun to represent the beam

In late 2021, Hasbro announced a 1:1 scale replica of Spengler's Proton Pack as a Haslab crowdfunding campaign, with preorders opening in late October of 2021. The project was successfully backed by the deadline and was put into production, with an estimated release date of Spring 2023. However, shipments have started during January 2023, which is earlier than the original estimate. Another replica is said to be released from fun.com .<ref>

References

Ghostbusters
Fictional energy weapons

sv:Ghostbusters#Proton Pack